Anthony Taylor (born 20 October 1978) is an English professional football referee from Wythenshawe, Manchester. In 2010, he was promoted to the list of Select Group Referees who officiate primarily in the Premier League, and in 2013 became a listed referee for FIFA allowing him to referee European and international matches. In 2015, he officiated the Football League Cup final at Wembley Stadium when Chelsea defeated Tottenham Hotspur 2–0. Taylor returned to Wembley later that year to officiate the Community Shield as Arsenal beat Chelsea 1–0. He refereed the 2017 and 2020 FA Cup finals, both between Chelsea and Arsenal; Arsenal won on both occasions 2–1. Upon the selection, he became the first man to referee a second FA Cup final since Arthur Kingscott in 1901.

Career

Early career
Taylor started refereeing in the Northern Premier League in 2002, progressing to officiate in the Conference North in 2004. He was appointed to the Football League referees' list at the start of the 2006–07 season and his first appointment was a 0–0 draw between Wrexham and Peterborough United in a League Two match in August 2006.

In November 2006 he refereed an England under-19s international friendly match against Switzerland under-19s at Gresty Road, the home of Crewe Alexandra; England won 3–2.

Professional career
Taylor's first Premier League appointment was a February 2010 encounter between Fulham and Portsmouth, which Fulham won 1–0. He refereed one more game in the top-flight during that season before being promoted to the League's list of Select Group of Referees for 2010–11.

In September 2010 he took charge of his fourth Premier League match, contested by Blackburn Rovers and Fulham. The match ended 1–1.

Taylor sent off three players in his first game of the 2011–12 season. Middlesbrough won 1–0 at Leeds United in a fixture which saw Jonny Howson and Max Gradel of Leeds and Boro's Tony McMahon dismissed, all for second bookable offences. Taylor refereed a total of 34 matches that season and dismissed eight players in total, including the three at Leeds.

Taylor became a FIFA listed referee on 1 January 2013, making him eligible to officiate UEFA European and FIFA international competitive games. In May 2013 he was fourth official to Andre Marriner for the FA Cup Final.

On the opening day of the 2013–14 season Taylor refereed Aston Villa's 3–1 victory away at Arsenal. He awarded Villa two penalties and dismissed Arsenal's Laurent Koscielny for two bookable offences. Arsène Wenger described Taylor's officiating of the match as "stubborn" but Villa manager Paul Lambert said that he thought the official "had a good game".

On 1 March 2015, Taylor was the referee for the Football League Cup final between Chelsea and Tottenham Hotspur.

In 2015, Taylor refereed both the 2015 FA Community Shield and the 2015 Football League Cup final.

On 26 April 2017, Taylor was chosen to be the main referee for the 2017 FA Cup final.

On 26 May 2018 he was chosen to officiate the 2018 EFL Championship play-off Final.

On 16 September 2020, Taylor was chosen to be the main referee for the 2020 UEFA Super Cup

On 12 June 2021, Taylor officiated a UEFA Euro 2020 group stage match between Finland and Denmark. In the 43rd minute, Danish midfielder Christian Eriksen collapsed on the pitch and required emergency treatment on the pitch before being transferred to a local hospital and stabilised. Taylor was praised for his calm but quick reaction to the situation, signalling for medical attention within seconds. The match was resumed later in the day once it became clear Eriksen's condition had improved. Taylor's earlier training in the prison service at HMP Manchester was cited as helpful for the situation by mentor Chris Foy.

In October 2021, Taylor was chosen to referee the 2021 UEFA Nations League Final between Spain and France.

In a May 2022 FIFA pronouncement, Taylor was listed as one of six English officials to oversee matches at that November and December's World Cup.  The list also included referee Michael Oliver and four compatriot assistant referees—Simon Bennett, Gary Beswick, Stuart Burt, and Adam Nunn.

Statistics

Statistics for all competitions. No records are available prior to 2006–07.

 Anthony Taylor

See also
List of football referees

References

External links
 
 
 
 
 

People from Wythenshawe
English football referees
Premier League referees
UEFA Champions League referees
UEFA Europa League referees
Living people
1978 births
Sportspeople from Manchester
FA Cup Final referees
UEFA Euro 2020 referees
2022 FIFA World Cup referees
FIFA World Cup referees